Plum Run is a  long 2nd order tributary to Tenmile Creek in Washington County, Pennsylvania.

Course
Plum Run rises about 0.5 miles west-southwest of Beallsville, Pennsylvania, and then flows south to join Tenmile Creek about 0.5 miles southeast of Fairfield.

Watershed
Plum Run drains  of area, receives about 40.9 in/year of precipitation, has a wetness index of 324.20 and is about 53% forested.

See also
List of rivers of Pennsylvania

References

Rivers of Pennsylvania
Rivers of Washington County, Pennsylvania
Allegheny Plateau